Giles Brugge of Cubberley, 6th Baron Chandos  (c. 1462 – 1 December 1511) born in Cubberley, Gloucester, England. The son of Thomas Brugge, 5th Baron Chandos, and Florence Darrell. Giles took part in the Battle of Blackheath on 22 June 1497 from which he was knighted for valour. He married Isabel Baynham, daughter of Thomas Baynham and Alice Walwyn. He held the office of High Sheriff of Gloucestershire for 1499.

Children
The children of Giles and Isabel included:
Sir John Brydges, 1st Baron Chandos of Sudeley (9 March 1491/2 –  12 April 1557) married Elizabeth Grey
Thomas Brydges of Cornbury and Keinsham Abbey, Sheriff of Gloucestershire, then of Berkshire and Oxfordshire (died 14 November 1559)
 William Brugge (mentioned in his will). Inherited his father's lands in Brakenborowe and Horton. He is probably the William Bridges brother of Sir John Bridges who married about 1538 Anne the daughter of William Barker of Chiswick. The legality of this marriage was challenged by Symone Cornethwaite who was living with Lord Russell.
 Catherine Brugge (d.1556) who married (1) Leonard Poole (d.1538) of Saperton who was gentleman usher to the king and (2) Sir David Brooke of Horton (d.1559)

Notes

References

Further reading
.
State Paper Office, Miscellaneous letters. Hen VIII Third Series Volume IX, Original – 14 March 1538.

1460s births
1511 deaths
People from Gloucester
15th-century English people
16th-century English nobility
High Sheriffs of Gloucestershire
Gi
Burials at St Mary's Chapel, Sudeley Castle
6

Year of birth uncertain